Royal Air Force Pembroke Dock or more simply RAF Pembroke Dock was a Royal Air Force Seaplane and Flying Boat station located at Pembroke Dock, Pembrokeshire, Wales. The Royal Navy contingent left in 1926 with the Royal Air Force occupying the site from 1 January 1930. During the initial stages of the Second World War, it became the home of two Dutch flying boats and their squadron personnel as well as hosting RAF, Fleet Air Arm, Canadian, Royal Australian Air Force and United States naval crews.

It became the largest Flying Boat station in the world and at one point during the Second World War it was host to 99 aircraft.

The station badge showed a Manx Shearwater bird on one of the many islands that lie off the eastern Pembrokeshire coastline. The motto was in Welsh; Gwylio'r gorllewin o'r awyr which translates into English as "To watch the west from the air". The badge was approved and issued in January 1948.

History
Despite the Royal Navy abruptly withdrawing from Pembroke Dock in 1926, the haven along the Daugleddau estuary had been used by seaplanes of the Royal Naval Air Service and the Royal Air Force before a permanent seaplane air base was established. The Royal Air Force arrived in Pembroke Dock on 1 January 1930 with the first Squadron (No 210) arriving in June 1931. Throughout the 1930s, No 210 Squadron was the main Squadron operating from RAF Pembroke Dock and was equipped firstly with Supermarine Southamptons, Short Rangoons and Short Singapore IIIs.

The base was located on the south side of the estuary opposite the town of Milford Haven. The base was on a promontory which restricted space for buildings due to the local housing in the area.

Initially, the seaplane service only operated and carried out maintenance from a specially adapted floating dock known as HMS Flat Iron. This floating dock was able to submerge and allow two seaplanes to navigate onto it and then raise itself back up to allow for complex maintenance. During the 1930s the Royal Air Force improved RAF Pembroke Dock by the installation of two 'B' and one 'T' hangar and in 1938, the floating dock was towed to Invergordon as it was redundant. In 1935, the first spillway was constructed which allowed aircraft to be removed from the water whatever the tide. During this period, Sir Arthur Travers Harris (Bomber Harris) was the Officer Commanding RAF Pembroke Dock and 210 Squadron as a Wing Commander.

A third spillway was located at Neyland on the other side of the estuary to Pembroke Dock.

In 1934, 230 Squadron was reformed at RAF Pembroke Dock after having been disbanded in 1922. The Squadron would leave and return four times over the history of the base, but it was not active at Pembroke Dock during the Second World War. Its longest stay at the base was between February 1949 and February 1957.

In July 1936, RAF Pembroke Dock became part of the newly formed Coastal Command and would remain so until it closed down. It was assigned to No. 15 Group RAF with the headquarters being at Plymouth, but by 1941, 15 Group was assigned to Liverpool and Pembroke Dock became part of No 19. Group RAF. In 1938, its entry in the Air Force List designated it as belonging to No 16. Group RAF as a reconnaissance base. From 1938 onwards, Short Sunderland aircraft began arriving to replace older aircraft (Short Singapore and Supermarine Stranraer) on 210 and 228 Squadrons. The Sunderland became synonymous with the base and 210 Squadron and was the workhorse during the Second World War. In December 1936, No. 228 Squadron was stood up after having previously been disbanded at RNAS Killingholme. During the decade between 1936 and 1945, 228 Squadron was allocated to RAF Pembroke Dock 5 times, often for short intervals where individual aircraft from the Squadron were detached out to other bases.

On 1 June 1940, several seaplanes of the Royal Netherlands Naval Air Service escaped from their bases in the Netherlands as they were being overrun by enemy forces. They flew to RAF Pembroke Dock where they became No. 320 (Netherlands) Squadron before RAF Carew Cheriton became their home base. Other nations that flew from Pembroke Dock including Canadians and the United States Navy. The Navy VP-63 flew Consolidated PBY Catalina aircraft and on arrival in 1943, was the first US Navy unit to operate in Europe

The flying boat squadrons operating from Pembroke Dock, were occupied with a myriad of tasks during the Second World War. Principal among these was Air Sea Rescue (ASR) with which most aircraft were equipped with Lindholme Gear for dropping into the sea for downed aircrews. The squadron also had responsibility for convoy escort duties in the Atlantic and also as hunter killers in Anti-Submarine Warfare (ASW). On 2 June 1943, a Short Sunderland of No 461 Squadron (11 Crew, 9 Australian, 2 British) was attacked whilst on an ASR patrol over the Bay of Biscay by 8 Junkers 88 fighter aircraft. The Sunderland had been searching the Bay of Biscay area for a downed BOAC aircraft that had been shot down over that area the previous day (and included amongst its passenger manifest the actor Leslie Howard) when it was attacked by the Luftwaffe. The crew managed to down three of the enemy aircraft, but limped home with an airframe like a colander due to the strafing bullet runs that the Junkers 88s had taken against it. The aircraft was landed hard at Praa Sands in Cornwall and whilst most of the crew were injured, there was only one fatality. The tide destroyed the airframe the next day.

In 1944, No 201 Squadron was transferred from Northern Ireland to help blockade the invasion area for D-Day. The plan was to prevent U-Boats from being able to enter the area and enter into combat with allied forces.

Three Sunderlands from No 230 Squadron were part of a 640 flying aircraft display put on at RAF Odiham for the Queen's Coronation Review. The display, held in June 1953, took exactly 27 minutes from start to finish. Throughout the 1950s, Sunderlands of No 201 and 230 Squadrons ferried scientists and support staff to and from the North Greenland expeditions. No 230 Squadron even adopted a Husky mascot puppy when bringing everyone including the dogs back  to Britain in 1954.

The last flying boat squadrons to operate from RAF Pembroke Dock were disbanded on 28 February 1957. A month later the base was put on a care and maintenance programme with final closure coming in 1959.

Squadrons
The various squadrons and units that were based at RAF Pembroke Dock are listed below.

Post RAF

In 1963, a Sunderland formerly of No. 201 Squadron was presented to the town by the French Navy. She was cleaned and repaired so that it could be displayed in the town. Due to the age and weather exposure of the aircraft, she was moved to the Royal Air Force Museum Hendon in 1971.

The two large 'B' type hangars have survived and are now both listed buildings. The eastern hangar was used in 1979 for a project nicknamed the Magic Roundabout to build a full-scale Millennium Falcon for use in the Star Wars film The Empire Strikes Back. Other parts of the dockyard, such as the spillways have been lost in the reconstruction of the dock for the cross Irish Sea ferry to Rosslare.

There has been a concerted effort to raise a Sunderland flying boat that sank during a fierce storm in 1940. It was rediscovered in 2006 after a fisherman found his lobster-pot was tied fast around the sunken airframe on the seabed. The aircraft (T9044) has lain underneath  of water since 1940 and has had various parts of its airframe already lifted out and cleaned to be put on display. It was the subject of an episode of the Channel 4 documentary series Wreck Detectives, which was filmed in 2003 and broadcast in 2004.

The Pembroke Dock Heritage Centre operates on part of the site. It is located in the former chapel of the Royal Dockyard and now houses a replica Sunderland cockpit with working controls that allow for a simulated flight over Milford Haven's estuary.

References

Bibliography

External links
 Pembroke Dock Heritage Centre
 1935 film of seaplane and floating dock

Royal Air Force stations in Wales
Military installations established in 1930
Seaplane bases in the United Kingdom
Military installations closed in 1959
Pembroke Dock